Alcira Espinoza Schmidt de Villegas was a Bolivian politician. She was appointed Minister of Labour and Health in 1969. She was the first woman to be cabinet minister of her country.

References

20th-century Bolivian women politicians
20th-century Bolivian politicians
Women government ministers of Bolivia